is a Japanese footballer currently playing as a defender for Tochigi SC, on loan from Montedio Yamagata.

Career statistics

Club
.

Notes

References

External links

1997 births
Living people
Meiji University alumni
Japanese footballers
Association football defenders
J2 League players
Montedio Yamagata players
Tochigi SC players